is a Japanese singer, musician and actress. She is one of the greatest influences on Japanese avant-garde music and media, and her career spans over 35 years. Her close friends over the years include Susumu Hirasawa. She was mainly active from 1981 with Guernica demos to 1995 with the release of HYS but is still making music as of now.

Career
After gaining attention a guest singer for the New Wave band Halmens and her acting roles in Japanese dramas and commercials for the Washlet, she began her professional music career in the early 1980s as a singer. In 1984, she released her debut solo album Tamahime-sama under the label of YEN records, containing themes of menstruation, womanhood, and romance with a recurring insect and pupa motif.  The following year, she came out with album Suki Suki Daisuki, a satirical take on aidoru music.  

Although her eccentric personality and unconventional style prevented her from attaining major pop success, she survived as an influential and respected underground music figure both solo and as the lead singer of the Shōwa era-themed group Guernica (1982–89) with former Halmens member Koji Ueno and her most commercial project Yapoos (1984-1995 and occasionally since,) where she is particularly noted for her connection to eroguro culture. Over the years she has formed many temporary backing bands such as the Jun Togawa Unit to accompany her. Generally the differentiation between her self-named bands and the Yapoos is a greater degree of collaboration in the latter.

Notable collaborators over the years include Haruomi Hosono who produced and wrote music for some of her earlier works. Her late sister Kyoko Togawa was an actress who at times ventured into the music world and cross collaborated at times. Around 1990 Jun shared management with Susumu Hirasawa resulting in quite a number of collaborations. 

She has acted in a number of films, such as Untamagiru and The Family Game.

In 1989, Susumu Hirasawa, who was currently freezing P-MODEL, joined the Yapoos as support, appearing in the "Bach Studio II" section of the TV program "Yume de Aietara", where he played in a session with Downtown, Ucchan Nanchan and Susumu Hirasawa.

In 1990, she joined Susumu Hirasawa's "World Turbine Tour," a live tour to celebrate the release of his second solo album, "Ghosts of Science," with Hikaru Kotobuki, Katsuhiko Akiyama, Kazuhide Akimoto (Akimoto Kitsune), Kazutoki Umezu, and others. She sang the duets Rocket, World Turbine, and Carboy and Indian with Hirasawa. Togawa has also toured with Hirasawa on other occasions.

In 1991, Togawa appeared on the TV Tokyo program "Jun Togawa x Susumu Hirasawa (MC: Kenzo Saeki) "Jun Togawa Revival Festival!"

In 1992, Susumu Hirasawa offered her "Beals (1992)" as a Yapoos song.

In 1995, "Showa Kyounen" was released to commemorate the 10th anniversary of Jun Togawa's performing career. Based on the concept of "covering nostalgic melodies of the Showa era," the album contained six songs arranged by Susumu Hirasawa. The songs include "Ribbon Knight" composed by Isao Tomita and arranged by Susumu Hirasawa.

Her 2004 album, Togawa Fiction, with the Jun Togawa Band, featured elements of progressive rock, electropop and other genres. In 2008, she released a career-spanning three-CD boxed set, Togawa Legend Self Select Best & Rare 1979-2008 which featured many of her most popular songs along with several scarcer tracks and hard to find collaborations.

In a 2001 interview, influential alternative musician and producer Jim O'Rourke, amongst others, picked a Togawa cover song album 20th Jun Togawa as one of his "best albums of the year."

She marked the 35th anniversary of her professional career in 2016 by releasing new collaboration albums with Vampillia and Hijokaidan, her first new recordings in twelve years.

The relationship between Jun Togawa and Susumu Hirasawa 
Jun Togawa and Susumu Hirasawa became close friends as they shared stories about each other's past and how they perceived gender and people. They participated in each other's tours, and in the 1990s, they worked together on music and gender-related conversations in magazines and on TV. Hirasawa says, "It's a difficult task to determine my favorite Jun Togawa song," referring to one of her masterpieces, "Giving Up Peshiganga," as "that is the god who made god." Togawa has also covered Hirasawa's solo song "Venus" at her own live performances.

Discography

Solo albums
[1984.01.24]  Tamahime-sama
[1985.11.10]  Suki Suki Daisuki

Collaboration albums 

[1985.03.25]  Kyokuto Ian Shoka (as Jun Togawa Unit)
[2016.01.20]  "Togawa Kaidan (戸川階段)" (with Hijokaidan.
[2016.12.14]  Watashi Ga Nakou Hototogisu (with Vampillia)
[2018.11.21]  Jun Togawa avec Kei Ookubo (with Kei Ookubo)

Albums with Yapoos 

 [1984.04.25]  Ura-Tamahime (live)
 [1987.12.16]  Yapoos Keikaku
[1988.09.21]  Daitenshi No Youni
[1991.06.07]  Dial Y O Mawase
[1992.10.28]  Dadada ism
[1995.01.31]  Yapoos No Fushin Na Koudou (live 1993)
[1995.06.21]  HYS
[2019.12.11]  ヤプーズの不審な行動 令和元年 - Suspicious Behavior Of Yapoos The 1st Year Of Reiwa Era (Yapoos)

Albums with Guernica 

 [1982.xx.xx]  Kaizou E No Yakudou (with Guernica)
 [1988.xx.xx]  Shinseiki E No Unga (with Guernica)
 [1989.03.05]  Denri-sou Kara no Manazashi (with Guernica)

Solo mini albums 

 [1989.12.16]  Showa Kyonen
 [2000.09.25]  20th Jun Togawa
 [2004.09.02]  Togawa Fiction (as Jun Togawa Band)

Singles, EPs
[1982.12.05]  Ginrin wa Utau / Maronie Dokuhon  Guernica
[1984.05.25]  Radar Man / Boshi Jusei  (Jun Togawa)
[1985.04.10]  Poesy / Poesy instrumental (Jun Togawa)
[1985.10.25]  Osozaki Girl  (Jun Togawa)
[1986.02.10]  Sayonara wo Oshiete  (Jun Togawa)
[1987.12.16]  Barbara Sexaroid / Cecil Cut  (Yapoos)    
[1990.10.21]  Virgin Blues  (Jun Togawa) 
[1991.07.21]  Infinite Productions Remix  (Jun Togawa in the '90s)
[1991.05.02]  Men's Junan  (Yapoos)
[1995.03.01]  Honou no Shoujo  (Yapoos) 
[2003.04.10]  CD-Y (mini-album)   (Yapoos)

Compilations
[1987.xx.xx]  Tokyo No Yaban (Tokyo Barbarism) (Jun Togawa) Remixed compilation
[1991.05.21]  Yapoos Best (Yapoos)
[1996.09.26]  Twins Super Best of Togawa Jun (2-CD set)
[2001.12.19]  Twin Very Best Collection (2-CD set) (Jun Togawa)
[2002.12.04]  In Memoria Futuri (three CD boxed set comprising Guernica's three original albums plus demos, live tracks, outtakes and live video footage of Guernica performing "Dokuro no enbukyoku" at Club Quattro, Shibuya, Tokyo on 27 July 1988) (Guernica)
[2008.07.09]  Togawa Legend Self Select Best & Rare 1979-2008 (3 CD boxed set) (Jun Togawa)
[2009.07.22]  Teichiku Works. Jun Togawa 30th Anniversary (6 CDs and 3 DVDs). The first 5 CDs are reissued albums with bonus tracks, the sixth CD features previously unreleased live and demo recordings of Guernica.
[2012.07.25]  Mushi no Onna - Mika Ninagawa Selection

Notable guest appearances
[1984.08.25]  Chojiku Korodasutan Ryokoki (Apogee & Perigee) Jun Togawa provides vocals for 4 tracks.
[1985.00.00]  Shijin no Ie (House Of The Poet) (Joe Jackson & The Tokyo Symphony Orchestra) Jun Togawa provides all vocals.
[1989.09.01]  Water in Time and Space (Susumu Hirasawa) Jun Togawa provides vocals for the track .
[1990.05.25]  The Ghost in Science (Susumu Hirasawa) Jun Togawa provides vocals for the tracks  & .
[1990.10.25]  error CD (Susumu Hirasawa) Jun Togawa provides vocals for the track .
[1991.05.25]  Virtual Rabbit (Susumu Hirasawa) Jun Togawa provides vocals for the track .
[1992.06.xx]  Histoire du Soldat (Neko Saito, Koichi Makigami, Jun Togawa, Demon Kogure) Jun Togawa plays the part of the Princess and also narrates this version of Igor Stravinsky's piece, conducted by Neko Saito.
[2001.08.30]  All Dogs Go To Heaven (CD Soundtrack to Keralino Sandorovich's stage play) Jun Togawa sings on three tracks: , Open The Night and {{Nihongo|Falling In Love Again |また恋しちゃったのよ |Mata koi shichatta no yo}}
[2002.03.26]  Dreams (Otomo Yoshihide's New Jazz Ensemble) Jun Togawa provides vocals for 3 tracks.
[2005.01.15]  Good Girls Get Fed, Bad Girls Get Eaten (Tricomi featuring Jun Togawa) Jun Togawa provides vocals for six of the eight tracks.
[2012.02.29]  HALDYN DOME'' (Susumu Hirasawa) Box Set that contains all previous appearances.
[2017.10.25] "Like the 20th Century" (Kei Ohkubo) Jun Togawa provides guest vocals for Vocalise No.1 and 20 Seiki Mitai Ni

References

External links
 Jun Togawa, Guernica, Yapoos, Koji Ueno, Yoichiro Yoshikawa, an annotated discography compiled by Nicholas D. Kent.
 [ Jun Togawa] at Allmusic.
  (Japanese)

1961 births
Living people
Japanese musicians
Japanese actresses
Musicians from Shinjuku